Jeffrey Graham (Jeff) Ellis  (born 4 May 1953 in Adelaide) is an Australian plant scientist, and Program Leader at CSIRO Plant Industry.

Life
He earned a BAgSc  in 1976, and a PhD in 1981, from the University of Adelaide. In 1984, as a Research Scientist in CSIRO Plant Industry, he worked on the identification of transcriptional control elements in the promoters of the maize alcohol dehydrogenase gene and the Agrobacterium T-DNA gene octopine synthase. Ellis and his research team were among the first to clone and characterize plant disease resistance genes.

References

External links
https://web.archive.org/web/20111202051201/http://royalsociety.org/New-Fellows-Seminar-2009/
https://web.archive.org/web/20120321082635/http://www.sciences.adelaide.edu.au/plant_genetics/genetics/cytogenetics.html

1953 births
Scientists from Adelaide
Fellows of the Royal Society
Fellows of the Australian Academy of Science
Australian geneticists
University of Adelaide alumni
Living people